This is a list of airports in Abkhazia, grouped by type and sorted by location.

Airports
Airport names shown in bold indicate the airport has scheduled service on commercial airlines.

The status of Abkhazia is disputed, with Georgia claiming it as an autonomous republic (see: Abkhazia and International recognition of Abkhazia and South Ossetia).

See also

 Georgian Air Force and Abkhazian Air Force
 List of airports by ICAO code: U#UG - Abkhazia
 Wikipedia: WikiProject Aviation/Airline destination lists: Asia#Abkhazia

References
 
  - includes IATA codes
 World Aero Data: Georgia - ICAO codes, coordinates
 Great Circle Mapper: Georgia - IATA and ICAO codes

Abkhazia
Airports